Leonid Grigoriyevich Ivanov (June 25, 1950 – October 24, 1980) was a member of Soviet Air Force Cosmonaut Training Group 6. He graduated from Higher Air Force School, Kachinsk, in 1971.

Ivanov was killed on October 24, 1980, in the crash of a MiG-27 aircraft during a test flight in Akhtubinsk, Astrakhan Oblast, Russian Soviet Federative Socialist Republic.

Reference 

1950 births
1980 deaths
Aviators killed in aviation accidents or incidents
Soviet cosmonauts
Soviet test pilots
Space program fatalities
Victims of aviation accidents or incidents in 1980
Victims of aviation accidents or incidents in the Soviet Union